Hemicoelus carinatus is a species in the subfamily Anobiinae ("death-watch beetles"), in the order Coleoptera ("beetles"). The species is known generally as the "Eastern deathwatch beetle".
It is found in North America.

References

Further reading
 Arnett, R.H. Jr., M. C. Thomas, P. E. Skelley and J. H. Frank. (eds.). (2002). American Beetles, Volume II: Polyphaga: Scarabaeoidea through Curculionoidea. CRC Press LLC, Boca Raton, FL.
 Arnett, Ross H. (2000). American Insects: A Handbook of the Insects of America North of Mexico. CRC Press.
 Richard E. White. (1983). Peterson Field Guides: Beetles. Houghton Mifflin Company.
 Say, T. (1823). "Descriptions of coleopterous insects collected in the late expedition to the Rocky Mountains, performed by order of Mr. Calhoun, Secretary of War, under command of Major Long". Journal of the Academy of Natural Sciences of Philadelphia, vol. 3, pt. 1, 139–216.
 White, Richard E. (1982). "A catalog of the Coleoptera of America north of Mexico. Family: Anobiidae". US Department of Agriculture, Agriculture Handbook, 529–570.

External links
NCBI Taxonomy Browser, Hemicoelus carinatus

Anobiinae
Beetles described in 1823